Reggie Morrison (24 March 1864 - 1 May 1941) is a former Scotland international rugby union player.

Rugby Union career

Amateur career

He played for Edinburgh University. He captained the side between 1885 and 1887.

Provincial career

He played for Edinburgh District in the inter-city match against Glasgow District on 5 December 1885. He scored 2 tries in the match.

He played for East of Scotland District against West of Scotland District on 30 January 1886. He also played in the corresponding 1887 fixture.

International career

He was capped 3 times for Scotland in 1886. He scored 2 tries in Scotland's win over Ireland.

His great-granddaughter in law brought Morrison's Scotland international cap back to Murrayfield Stadium in 2010, so that it can be displayed by the Scottish Rugby Union. It is now showcased at the President's Suite at the stadium. She also brought a cap Morrison obtained from the university; and another cap.

Other sports

Growing up in Geelong, Victoria, Australia, Morrison first played Australian Rules Football for Geelong Football Club.

Morrison ran in the 1885 Scottish Athletic Championships organised by the S.A.A. Noted as unlucky, Morrison came third in 3 events: 100 yards, 440 yards and the 880 yards races. All 3 races were noted as very close, and Morrison's combined losing distance over the 3 races was only 3 feet.

Medical career

He graduated from Edinburgh University with a degree in medicine. He was to return to Australia where he set up a G.P. practice in Toorak, Victoria. He worked as a gynaecologist at the Royal Women's Hospital in Melbourne; and was one of the founders of the Royal Australasian College of Surgeons.

References

1864 births
1941 deaths
Scottish rugby union players
Scotland international rugby union players
East of Scotland District players
Edinburgh District (rugby union) players
Edinburgh University RFC players
Rugby union players from Geelong
Rugby union centres